DTVA may refer to:
 Disney Television Animation
 Teesside International Airport previously known as Durham Tees Valley Airport